Synaphe berytalis is a species of moth of the family Pyralidae. It was described by Émile Louis Ragonot in 1889. It is found in Lebanon.

References

Moths described in 1889
Pyralini
Insects of Turkey